Fred Erskine is an American bass guitarist best known as a member of the band Hoover. In addition to being a member of multiple groups from the D.C. area, such as The Crownhate Ruin and The Sorts, he also played with the Louisville band, June of 44.

Biography 
Frederick T. Erskine began his foray into music at the age of four when he started learning to play violin. He began expanding his musical palette and soon picked up playing the piano until he settled on learning the trumpet when he was eight. In November 1987, Erskine had begun performing vocals for a punk band which led to him picking up the bass.

References

External links

Living people
People from Washington, D.C.
American rock bass guitarists
American indie rock musicians
Math rock musicians
Post-hardcore musicians
Post-rock musicians
June of 44 members
Guitarists from Washington, D.C.
American male bass guitarists
Year of birth missing (living people)